Ololygon arduous is a species of frog in the family Hylidae endemic to Brazil. Its natural habitat is subtropical or tropical moist lowland forests. It is threatened by habitat loss.

Sources

arduous
Endemic fauna of Brazil
Frogs of South America
Amphibians described in 2002
Taxonomy articles created by Polbot